Saleman is a language of Seram, Indonesia. The names Saleman and Sawai are villages where it is spoken.

External links

Central Maluku languages
Languages of Indonesia
Seram Island